List of railway stations in Sri Lanka, in alphabetical order, are as follows:

A 

 Abanpola, North Western Province
 Agbopura, Eastern Province
 Ahangama, Southern Province
 Ahungalle, Southern Province
 Akurala, Southern Province
 Alawwa, North Western Province
 Alawathupitiya,
 Aluthgama, Western Province
 Ambalangoda, Southern Province
 Ambepussa, Western Province
 Ambewela, Central Province
 Angulana, Western Province
 Anuradhapura, New Town
 Anuradhapura, North Central Province
 Arachchikattuwa
 Avissawella

B 

 Badulla, Uva Province 
 Balapitiya, Southern Province
 Babarenda, Southern Province
 Bambalapitiya, Western Province
 Bandarawela, Uva Province
 Bangadeniya, North Western Province
 Batticaloa, Eastern Province - terminus
 Batuwatta, Western Province
 Bemmulla, Western Province
 Beliatta, Southern Province
 Bentota, Southern Province
 Beruwala, Western Province
 Boossa, Southern Province
 Bothale, Western Province
 Bulugahoda, Western Province

C 
 Chavakachcheri, Northern Province
 Chenkaladi, Eastern Province
 Chilaw, North Western Province
 Chunnakam, Northern Province
 Colombo Fort, Western Province
 Colombo, Western Province (currently the National Railway Museum, Colombo)

D 
 Dematagoda, Western Province
 Daraluwa, Western Province
 Dehiwala, Western Province
 Demodara, Uva Province
 Diyatalawa, Uva Province

E 
 Egoda Uyana, Western Province
 Elephant Pass, Northern Province 
 Eluthumadduval, Northern Province
 Enderamulla, Western Province

F 
 Free Trade Zone (formerly Katunayake South), Western Province

G 
 Galle, Southern Province - terminus being extended
 Gampaha, Western Province
 Gampola, Central Province
 Ganemulla, Western Province
 Ganewatta, North Western Province
 Gintota, Southern Province

H 
 Habaraduwa, Southern Province
 Habarane, North Central Province
 Halawatha 
 Hali Ela, Uva Province
 Haputale, Uva Province
 Hath Amuna, North Central Province
 Hatton, Central Province
 Hettimulla, Western Province
 Hikkaduwa, Southern Province
 Hindeniya-Pattigoda, Western Province
 Hingurakgoda, North Central Province
 Horape, Western Province
 Hunupitiya, Western Province
 Horiwila, North Central Province

I 
 Idalgashinna, Uva Province
 Induruwa, Southern Province
 Inuvil, Jaffna District, Northern Province

J 
 Ja-Ela, Western Province
 Jaffna, Northern Province
 Jayanthipura, North Central Province

K 
  Kahawa, Southern Province 
 Kalutara North, Western Province
 Kalutara South, Western Province
 Kamburugamuwa, Southern Province
 Kandana, Western Province
 Kandy, Central Province
 Kankesanthurai, Northern Province - terminus
 Kantalai, Eastern Province
 Kapuwatte, Western Province
 Kataragama, Southern Province
 Kathaluwa, Southern Province
 Katugoda, Southern Province
 Katukurunda, Western Province
 Katunayake railway station, Western Province
 Katunayake Airport (BIA), Western Province
 Keenawala, Western Province
 Kekanadura, Southern Province
 Kekirawa, North Central Province
 Kelaniya, Western Province
 Kilinochchi, Northern Province
 Kinigama, Uva Province
 Kodikamamam, Northern Province
 Koggala, Southern Province
 Kokgala, Southern Province
 Kookuvil, Northern Province
 Kollupitiya, Western Province
 Kondavil, Northern Province
 Koralawella, Western Province
 Kosgoda, Southern Province
 Kotugoda, Western Province
 Kudahakapola, Western Province
 Kurunegala, North Western Province

L 
 Laxauyana, North Central Province
 Liyanagemulla, Western Province 
 Lunawa, Western Province 
 Lunuwila, North Western Province

M 
 Magalegoda, Western Province
 Maggona, Western Province
 Maharagama, Western Province
 Maho, North Western Province
 Mallakam, Northern Province
 Manampitiya, North Central Province
 Mankulam, Northern Province
 Mannar, Northern Province
 Maradana, Western Province
 Matale, Central Province - terminus
 Matara, Southern Province
 Maviddapuram, Northern Province
 Medawachchiya, North Central Province
 Meesalai, Northern Province
 Mirigama, Western Province
 Mirissa, Southern Province
 Mirusuvil, Northern Province
 Moratuwa, Western Province
 Mount Lavinia, Western Province
 Murikandy, Northern Province
 Murikandy Temple, Northern Province

N 
 Naththandiya, North Western Province
 Navatkuly, Northern Province
 Negombo, Western Province
 Nugegoda, Western Province
 Nanu Oya, Central Province
 Nawalapitiya, Central Province - Operation Control Office

O 
 Ohiya, Uva Province
 Omanthai, Northern Province

P 
 Padukka, Western Province
 Palai, Northern Province
 Pallewela, Western Province
 Parakum Uyana, North Central Province
 Paranthan, Northern Province
 Pattipola, Central Province
 Payagala North, Western Province
 Payagala South, Western Province
 Peradeniya Junction, Central Province - terminus
 Perelman day, Western Province
 Piladuwa, Southern Province
 Pilimathalawa, Central Province
 Pinwatta, Western Province 
 Polgahawela Junction, North Western Province
 Polonnaruwa, North Central Province
 Polwathumodara, Southern Province
 Puliyahkulam, Northern Province
 Punkankulam, Northern Province
 Puttalam, North Western Province - branch terminus

R 
 Ragama, Western Province
 Rambukkana, Sabaragamuwa Province
 Rathmalane, Western Province
 Richmond Hill, Southern Province
 Radella, Central Province
 Rozella, Central Province

S 
 Sankathanai, Northern Province
 Sarasavi Uyana, Central Province
 Seeduwa, Western Province
 Sewanapitiya, North Central Province
 Slave Island, Western Province

T 
 Talaimannar, Northern Province - terminus, ferry port
 Talpe, Southern Province
 Tellipalai, Northern Province
 Thachanthoppu, Northern Province
 Telwatte, Southern Province
 Thandikulam, Northern Province
 Trincomalee, Eastern Province - terminus, ocean port
 Thambutthegama, North Central Province
 Thembiligala, Central Province

U 
 Ukuwela - Central Province
 Unawatuna, Southern Province
 Ulapane, Central Province

V 
 Valaichchenai, Eastern Province
 Vavuniya, Northern Province
 Veyangoda, Western Province

W 
 Wadduwa, Western Province 
 Walpola, Western Province 
 Wanawasala, Western Province 
 Wandurawa, Western Province
 Wattegama - Central Province
 Welikanda, North Central Province
 Weligama, Southern Province
 Wellawatta, Western Province 
 Wijayarajadahana, Western Province
 Wavurukannala, Southern Province

Y 
 Yagoda, Western Province 
 Yaththalgoda, Western Province

Under construction or reconstruction or proposed 
 Kataragama
 Walasgala
 Seetawaka 
 Ratnapura
 Embilipitiya

 Hambantota
 Kataragama

Closed stations 
All of the narrow gauge lines have been closed. The Maradana to Avissawella section of the Kelani Valley line has been converted to broad gauge. All stations serving narrow gauge tracks have been closed with the exception of the Maradana to Avissawella section, as it was converted to broad gauge.
(All closed stations are not in the list)

 Padukka - Reopened
 Avissawella - Rebuilt
 Eheliyagoda
 Kuruwita
 Ratnapura 
 Opanayaka

 Yatiyantota
 Karawanella

 Nuwara Eliya
 Kandapola
 Ragala

See also 
List of railway stations in Sri Lanka by line

Maps 
 UN Map

References

External links 
 Sri Lanka Railways (Official Website)
 Rail routes in Sri Lanka

Sri Lanka
Rail
Railway stations